Jeff(rey) or Geoff(rey) Ro(w)land may refer to:

Jeffrey Rowland (born 1974), creator of the webcomic WIGU
Jeff Roland (born 16 June 1969), French artist and curator
Jeff Rowland (soccer) (born 1984), American soccer player
Geoffrey Rowland, Bailiff of Guernsey, 2005–